Emily Weddell Acland (  Harper, 1830 – 24 July 1905) was a pioneer settler in New Zealand and a watercolour artist. Her paintings of early Christchurch are held in the collection of the Christchurch Art Gallery.

Biography 
Acland was born in 1830, the eldest daughter of 15 children of her parents Henry Harper, who became Bishop of Christchurch, and Emily Harper (née Wooldridge). The family arrived in Christchurch on 23 December 1856 on the Egmont.

On 17 January 1860, she married politician John Acland at St Michael's Church in Christchurch. John Acland owned land in the Canterbury high country at Mount Peel, and the couple farmed there together. They had 11 children of whom two died in infancy. Acland became a keen mountaineer and the Emily Falls in Peel Forest are named after her. Acland also went on fern collecting expeditions.

Acland died in Christchurch on 24 July 1905 after a short illness. She was survived by her three sons and five daughters.

References

1830 births
1905 deaths
19th-century New Zealand artists
English emigrants to New Zealand
Women watercolorists
New Zealand watercolourists
Harper family
Emily